Freddie Joe Douglas (born March 28, 1954 in McGehee, Arkansas) is a former National Football League wide receiver who played for the Tampa Bay Buccaneers in 1976. He attended McGehee High School and then the University of Arkansas.

References

Living people
1954 births
Tampa Bay Buccaneers players
American football wide receivers
Arkansas Razorbacks football players
People from McGehee, Arkansas